Bozüyükspor is a Turkish sports club founded in 1973 and is currently playing in the Regional Amateur League. Their colors are navy blue and white. They play their home matches in Bozüyük Şehir Stadı in Bozüyük, Bilecik Province. The club is a brother team of Eskişehirspor because Bozüyük is just 40 km away from Eskişehir and is bounded economically to them. Their highest achievement so far is that they played in the old Second League in the 1991–92 season.

League participations
 TFF First League: 1991–92
 TFF Second League: 1984–91, 1992–98, 2007–
 TFF Third League: 2006–07
 Turkish Regional Amateur League: 1973–84, 1998–06

External links
Official web site
Bozüyükspor on TFF page

 
Football clubs in Turkey
1973 establishments in Turkey
Association football clubs disestablished in 2016